New Corydon is an unincorporated community in Wabash Township, Jay County, Indiana.

History
New Corydon was platted in 1844. It took its name after Corydon, Indiana. A post office was established at New Corydon in 1844, and remained in operation until it was discontinued in 1960.

Geography

References

Unincorporated communities in Jay County, Indiana
Unincorporated communities in Indiana